Emam Taqi (also Romanized as Emām Taqī; also known as Shāh Taqī, Shāh Takī, and Shāh Taqī-ye Pīveh Zhan) is a village in Piveh Zhan Rural District, Ahmadabad District, Mashhad County, Razavi Khorasan Province, Iran. At the 2006 census, its population was 675, in 192 families.

References 

Populated places in Mashhad County